The Order of Military Merit Antonio Nariño is an order granted by Colombia. It is the highest order awarded for meritorious devotion to military duty.

Grades
The Order of National Merit Antonio Nariño is awarded in the following grades:
 Grand Cross (Gran Cruz)
 Grand Officer (Gran Oficial)
 Commander (Comendador)
 Officer (Oficial)
 Knight (Caballero)
 Companion (Compañero)

References

External links
CAPÍTULO IV. CONDECORACIONES POR VIRTUDES MILITARES Y PROFESIONALES DE CARÁCTER EXCEPCIONAL DE LAS ÓRDENES Y SU CONSEJO.

Orders, decorations, and medals of Colombia